Saint Joseph is a painting by the Flemish artist Michaelina Wautier, painted some time between 1650 and 1656. It is one of many paintings by Wautier in the Kunsthistorisches Museum, Vienna.

References 

Paintings by Michaelina Wautier
1650s paintings
Paintings of Saint Joseph